The 2003 Bracknell Forest Borough Council election took place on 1 May 2003, to elect all 42 councillors in 18 wards for Bracknell Forest Borough Council in England.  The election was held on the same day as other local elections in England as part of the 2003 United Kingdom local elections.  Due to a boundary review there had been a change in ward boundaries, along with an increase in size from 40 members elected in 2000.  The Conservative Party secured a third term in office, increasing its majority, whilst the opposition Labour Party lost its group leader.  The Liberal Democrats re-entered the council for the first time at an all-out council election since 1995, and the first at which the eurosceptic UK Independence Party stood a candidate.

Ward results

Ascot

Binfield with Warfield

Bullbrook

Central Sandhurst

College Town

Crown Wood

Crowthorne

Great Hollands North

Great Hollands South

Hanworth

Harmans Water

Little Sandhurst & Wellington

Old Bracknell

Owlsmoor

Priestwood & Garth

Warfield Harvest Ride

Wildridings & Central

Winkfield & Cranbourne

By-elections

Binfield with Warfield

Footnotes

References

Bracknell Forest Borough Council elections
Bracknell